Zhokhov Island is an island in the East Siberian Sea, situated 128 km north east of Novaya Sibir Island, the easternmost of the New Siberian Islands. Administratively the island belongs to the Yakutia administrative division of Russia.

Geography
Zhokhov Island is part of the De Long group. The nearest island is Vilkitsky Island, the southernmost island of the group.

Although the island itself is unglaciated, the sea surrounding Zhokhov Island is covered with fast ice, even during the summer, and the climate is severe.

Geology
Zhokhov Island is an eroded late Cenozoic stratovolcano. Deeply cut seacliffs expose alternating flows of massive and blister lava, agglomerate and tuff. The exposed throat of this volcano is filled with columnar jointed basalts. The surrounding volcanic edifice consists of interlayered picrite–olivine basalts lava flows and beds of volcanic ash containing large volcanic bombs. The basalt lava flows range in age from 1.2 to 10 Ma according to K–Ar dating. The basalts contain xenoliths of sandstones, limestones, granites, syenites, and dolerites. Rare limestone xenoliths contain middle Carboniferous, tropical, marine invertebrate fossils.

Vegetation
Rush/grass, forb, cryptogam tundra covers the Zhokhov Island. It is tundra consisting mostly of very low-growing grasses, rushes, forbs, mosses, lichens, and liverworts. These plants either mostly or completely cover the surface of the ground. The soils are typically moist, fine-grained, and often hummocky.

History
Mesolithic humans occupied the island as early as 6000 BCE. Tools of stone, bone, antler, and ivory have been found, as well as wooden arrow shafts and a sledge runner. Animal remains suggest a culture dependent on the hunting of polar bears and reindeer. Evidence published in 2017 suggests that the early inhabitants of Zhokhov Island were among the first humans to selectively breed dogs. DNA extracted from a 9,500-year-old dog, Zhokhov, named after the island, contributed significant genetic material to the Greenland Dog, the Alaskan Malamute and the Siberian Husky.

In modern times, Zhokhov Island was discovered by the 1910–1915 Russian Arctic Ocean Hydrographic Expedition under Boris Vilkitsky on the ships Vaygach and Taymyr. It was originally named Novopashenniy Island, after Piotr Alekseyevich Novopashenniy (1881–1950) Captain of icebreaker Vaygach, but in 1926 it was renamed after Lieutenant Alexey Zhokhov, a member of the expedition.

Climate

In popular culture

Zhokhov Island is mentioned in Stanley Kubrick's Dr. Strangelove or: How I Learned to Stop Worrying and Love the Bomb as a place where the Russians built the doomsday device.

Ostrov Zhokhova is also mentioned in the Soviet "sad comedy" film by Georgii Danelia "Osennii Marafon" (Autumn Marathon). The film's "hero" Andrei Buzykin's daughter and her husband depart to take up a job in the weather station on Zhokhov Island, to Andrei's horror.

See also
 List of islands of Russia

References

Further reading 
 Anisimov, M.A., and V.E. Tumskoy, 2002, Environmental History of the Novosibirskie Islands for the last 12 ka. 32nd International Arctic Workshop, Program and Abstracts 2002. Institute of Arctic and Alpine Research, University of Colorado at Boulder, pp 23–25.
 Headland, R. K.,1994, OSTROVA DE-LONGA ('De Long Islands'), Scott Polar Research Institute, University of Cambridge, Cambridge, United Kingdom.
 Schirrmeister, L., H.-W. Hubberten, V. Rachold, and V.G. Grosse, 2005, Lost world - Late Quaternary environment of periglacial Arctic shelves and coastal lowlands in NE-Siberia.  2nd International Alfred Wegener Symposium Bremerhaven, October, 30 - November 2, 2005.

De Long Islands
Islands of the East Siberian Sea
Prehistory of the Arctic
Islands of the Sakha Republic